Eilertsen is a surname. Notable people with the surname include:

 Eilert Eilertsen (1918–2014), Norwegian footballer and politician
 Maryon Eilertsen 1950–2015), Norwegian actress
 Mats Eilertsen (born 1975), Norwegian musician and composer
 Nikolai Eilertsen (born 1978), Norwegian bass guitarist
 Trine Eilertsen (born 1969), Norwegian newspaper editor